

A list of films produced in Italy in 1968 (see 1968 in film):

References

Footnotes

Sources

External links
Italian films of 1968 at the Internet Movie Database

Lists of 1968 films by country or language
1968
Films